Jacques Monsieur is a Belgian convicted large arms trafficker. He is one of the biggest weapons smugglers in the world and is currently incarcerated in Saint-Gilles Prison.

In 2018 he was sentenced to four years in prison by the Court of Appeals in Brussels and fined 1.2 million. He subsequently fled. He was 66 years old when he was arrested in Portugal in August 2019.

References

People convicted of arms trafficking
Belgian criminals
Living people
Year of birth missing (living people)
1950s births